Micropraonetha is a genus of longhorn beetles of the subfamily Lamiinae, containing the following species:

 Micropraonetha carinipennis Breuning, 1939
 Micropraonetha multituberculata Breuning, 1982

References

Pteropliini
Taxa named by Stephan von Breuning (entomologist)